Tracy Moens (née Henderson) is a former American rugby union player. She was a part of the  squad that won the inaugural 1991 Women's Rugby World Cup in Wales.

Moens made her Eagles debut on November 14, 1987 against Canada at Victoria, British Columbia. It was the first-ever women's test match that was played outside of Europe. She also featured for the USA women's 7s in 1997. Between 2002 and 2006 she was the Strength and Conditioning Coach for the Eagles.

Henderson and the 1991 World Cup squad were inducted into the United States Rugby Hall of Fame in 2017.

References 

Year of birth missing (living people)
Living people
Female rugby union players
American female rugby union players
United States women's international rugby union players
American female rugby sevens players
United States international rugby sevens players
Female rugby sevens players